Topola Wielka  is a village in the administrative district of Gmina Przygodzice, within Ostrów Wielkopolski County, Greater Poland Voivodeship, in west-central Poland.

The village has a population of 470.

References

Topola Wielka